Andrés Gustavo Herzog Sánchez (born 21 January 1974) is a Spanish lawyer and politician who is the spokesperson of the centrist party Union, Progress and Democracy (UPyD).

Background
Herzog was born in San Sebastián, Basque Country, and is the son of Carlos Herzog, a fur merchant of Polish-Jewish descent. His household observed neither Basque nor Jewish traditions. He graduated in Law from the University of Navarre, and trialled for representing Spain at Judo at the 1996 Summer Olympics.

Career
Herzog worked for the law firm Garrigues. Upon reading their initial manifesto in 2007, he joined UPyD.

In July 2015, he was voted as the party's new spokesperson after the resignation of Rosa Díez. He refused an electoral pact with fellow centrists Citizens.

Personal life
Herzog is married to an Argentine woman. His favourite television series is political drama The West Wing, and his favourite film is The Bridges of Madison County.

References

External links

1974 births
Living people
Spanish people of Polish descent
Spanish people of Jewish descent
University of Navarra alumni
20th-century Spanish lawyers
Union, Progress and Democracy politicians
Spanish male judoka
Politicians from San Sebastián
21st-century Spanish lawyers